The superior pharyngeal constrictor muscle is a quadrilateral muscle of the pharynx. It is the uppermost and thinnest of the three pharyngeal constrictors.

The muscle is divided into four parts according to its four distincts origins: a pterygopharyngeal, buccopharyngeal, mylopharyngeal, and a glossopharyngeal part. The muscle inserts onto the pharyngeal raphe, and pharyngeal spine. It is innervated by pharyngeal branch of the vagus nerve via the pharyngeal plexus. It acts to convey a bolus down towards the esophagus, facilitating swallowing.

Anatomy

Origin 
The four parts of the muscle are distinguished depending upon the origin:

 Pterygopharyngeal part - originating from the lower third of the posterior margin of the medial pterygoid plate and its hamulus
 Buccopharyngeal part - originating from the pterygomandibular raphe
 Mylopharyngeal part - originating from the alveolar process of the mandible above the posterior end of the mylohyoid line
 Glossopharyngeal part - a few fibers originating from the side of the tongue

Insertion 
The fibers curve backward to be inserted into the pharyngeal raphe, being also prolonged by means of an aponeurosis to the pharyngeal spine on the basilar part of the occipital bone.

Innervation 
The superior pharyngeal constrictor muscle is innervated by the pharyngeal branch of the vagus nerve via the pharyngeal plexus.

Relations 
The interval between the upper border of the muscle and the base of the skull is closed by the pharyngeal aponeurosis, and is known as the sinus of Morgagni.

There is an interval between superior pharyngeal constrictor and middle pharyngeal constrictor, this space contains glossopharyngeal nerve, lingual nerve and the stylopharyngeus muscle.

The superior fibers arch beneath the levator veli palatini muscle and the Eustachian tube.

Actions/movements 
As soon as the bolus of food is received in the pharynx, the elevator muscles relax, the pharynx descends, and the constrictors contract upon the bolus, conveying it downward into the esophagus.

Additional images

References

External links
 
 

Muscles of the head and neck
Pharynx